Lloyd Tennant (born 9 April 1968) is an English former cricketer active from 1986 to 1995 who played for Leicestershire. He appeared in ten first-class matches as a right-handed batsman who bowled right-arm medium fast. In first-class cricket, he scored 110 runs with a highest score of 23* and took fifteen wickets with a best performance of four for 54.

In retirement, he served on the Leicestershire coaching staff until 2015. He proved successful in leading the club's 2nd XI. In 2017 he was appointed by the England and Wales Cricket Board as a cricket liaison officer. He was appointed as the Head Coach of Central Sparks in 2020.

References

1968 births
Living people
English cricketers
Leicestershire cricketers
Staffordshire cricketers
English cricket coaches